Highlife (full title Music from the New African Nations featuring the Highlife) is an album by American jazz pianist Randy Weston recorded in 1963 and originally released on the Colpix label. Weston had traveled to Africa for the first time in 1961 for a series of concerts in Lagos, Nigeria, sponsored by the American Society of African Culture, and the album is inspired by the music of the African continent, in particular the highlife genre of West Africa.

Reception

Allmusic awarded the album 5 stars, with its reviewer Scott Yanow stating: "Highly recommended, these sessions are among the recorded highpoints of Randy Weston's productive career."

Track listing 
''All compositions by Randy Weston except as indicated
 "Caban Bamboo Highlife" - 2:46   
 "Niger Mambo" (Bobby Benson) - 5:03   
 "Zulu" - 4:42   
 "In Memory Of" - 7:46   
 "Congolese Children" - 2:34   
 "Blues to Africa" - 6:23   
 "Mystery of Love" (Guy Warren) - 7:41

Personnel 
Randy Weston - piano
Ray Copeland - trumpet, flugelhorn
Jimmy Cleveland, Quentin Jackson - trombone
Julius Watkins - French horn
Aaron Bell - tuba
Budd Johnson - soprano saxophone, tenor saxophone
Booker Ervin - tenor saxophone
Peck Morrison - bass
Charlie Persip - drums
Frankie Dunlop - drums, percussion
Archie Lee - congas, percussion
George Young - percussion
Melba Liston - arranger

References 

Randy Weston albums
1963 albums
Colpix Records albums
Albums arranged by Melba Liston